Ljuboten (Serbian and ) or Luboten (in Albanian) is a peak of the Šar Mountains located on the border between Kosovo and North Macedonia.
 
Ljuboten, although not the highest peak of the range, is somewhat isolated from the rest of the mountains, making it visible from both Pristina and Skopje.

The majority of Ljuboten, the north, north-west, east, and south-east sides are located within Serbia. On the Macedonian side of the peak there is a mountain house called Ljuboten, as well as Shija Ljubotenska ("Ljuboten's Neck"), Kozja Karpa ("Goat's Rock"), Shiljast Kamen ("Pointed Rock"), and Rogacevski Korita.

Ljuboten is a popular destination for mountain climbers in Europe. The mountain is covered with pastures along with rocky outcroppings. Livadh Lake in Serbia and a few sheepfolds are near the peak. In winter there is usually over a meter of snow. 
The mountain house at Ljuboten is located in the foothills of the peak, connected with a road to Vratnica.

US soldiers stationed at Camp Bondsteel near the city of Ferizaj colloquially named the peak "Big Duke". The meaning behind the name is not known.

See also

 Vratnica
 FK Ljuboten ("FC Ljuboten")

Annotations

External links 
 Ljuboten.com (in Macedonian)
 Ljuboten @ Vratnica.net (in Macedonian)
 Cyber VRATNICA Internet Site

International mountains of Europe
Two-thousanders of North Macedonia
Two-thousanders of Kosovo
Šar Mountains